IVD may refer to:
 Induced vaginal delivery, a method of birth where labor is artificially induced
 Instrumental vaginal delivery, a method of birth with assistance from a medical instrument
 Intra-Vas Device, a device used in vas-occlusive contraception, a method of contraception for males
 Intervertebral disc, a component of the spine
 IVD, a human gene for production of Isovaleryl-CoA dehydrogenase
 Intake valve deposits, deposits which may form on a Poppet valve intake
 In vitro diagnostics, a category of medical tests
 Ideographic Variation Database, a database of Unicode's ideographic variation sequences